Sydney Smith (11 April 1856 – 21 February 1934) was an Australian politician. He began his parliamentary career in the New South Wales Legislative Assembly (1882–1898, 1900) and served as a government minister under Henry Parkes. He transferred to the new House of Representatives after Federation, representing the Division of Macquarie from 1901 to 1906. He served as Postmaster-General in the Reid government from 1904 to 1905.

Early years
Born in Colyton, near Penrith, west of Sydney, the son of a hotel keeper, Smith was educated at public schools before gaining work with the railways.  Following his marriage in 1879, Smith turned to auctioneering and grazing before following his brother, Thomas Richard, into Parliament.

State politics
Smith was first elected to the New South Wales Legislative Assembly in 1882, representing East Macquarie until its abolition in 1894 and then ran for nearby Bathurst.   Described as "tall, spare and bearded" but "not renowned for his oratory skills", the non-smoking teetotaller was made Secretary for Mines by Henry Parkes in 1889 and the inaugural Secretary for Agriculture in 1890, in which position he founded Hawkesbury Agricultural College.  He also found the time to serve as Mayor of Leichhardt Municipal Council from 1888–89.

Smith lost his seat by 103 votes at the 1898 New South Wales election when he ran on what many considered to be an anti-federalist stance and ran unsuccessfully against Edmund Barton for Hastings and Macleay in the by-election later that same year, before returning to the New South Wales Legislative Assembly in a by-election for Canterbury on 9 June 1900. However, his victory (by five votes) was declared void, and Smith was defeated at the subsequently reheld by-election on 28 July 1900.

Federal politics

While not a parliamentarian, Smith served on the executive of the Free Trade Party and began planning his campaign for a seat in the new federal parliament.  He decided to contest Macquarie at the first federal election in 1901 but was given little chance of victory by observers and the local press, who pointed to his earlier anti-federal views and his recent electoral losses as proof that he exercised little influence amongst the electorate.  Smith, however, gained the endorsement of the local branch of the influential Loyal Orange Lodge and the support of Free Trade Party leader George Reid—who enjoyed a large personal support amongst voters—and was elected. In 1903, he again won Macquarie, defeating William Sandford.

Smith served as a senior member of the Free Trade Party in opposition before helping to engineer the downfall of the Chris Watson government and its replacement by George Reid as Prime Minister.  Widely considered Reid's most faithful henchman during his time in parliament, Smith was made Postmaster-General by Reid but retired from political life following his defeat at the 1906 elections.
  
Smith died in Sydney on 21 February 1934, preceded by his wife and youngest son, killed during the Gallipoli landings.  Smith's eldest son, also named Sydney, served as president of the New South Wales Cricket Association from 1935–66.

References

 

Free Trade Party members of the Parliament of Australia
Members of the Australian House of Representatives for Macquarie
Members of the Australian House of Representatives
Members of the Cabinet of Australia
Members of the New South Wales Legislative Assembly
Australian auctioneers
1856 births
1934 deaths
20th-century Australian politicians
Mayors of Leichhardt